John W. Carter (September 10, 1792 – June 20, 1850) was a U.S. Representative from South Carolina.

Born on the Black River, near Camden, in what is now Kershaw County, South Carolina, Carter graduated from South Carolina College (now the University of South Carolina) at Columbia in 1811. He studied law and was admitted to the bar in 1814. He commenced practice in Camden, South Carolina. He served as commissioner in equity from 1814 until 1820.

Carter was elected as a Democratic-Republican to the Seventeenth Congress to fill the vacancy caused by the resignation of James Blair. He was reelected as a Jackson Republican to the Eighteenth Congress and as a Jacksonian to the Nineteenth and the Twentieth Congresses and served from December 11, 1822, to March 3, 1829.

He resumed the practice of law in Camden and moved to Georgetown, D.C., in 1836. He died there on June 20, 1850.

Sources

1792 births
1850 deaths
University of South Carolina alumni
Democratic-Republican Party members of the United States House of Representatives from South Carolina
Jacksonian members of the United States House of Representatives from South Carolina
19th-century American politicians
People from Georgetown (Washington, D.C.)